Kevin Anderson and Ryler DeHeart are the defending champions, but both chose not to participate.
Raven Klaasen and Izak van der Merwe won in the final against Kaden Hensel and Adam Hubble 5–7, 6–4, [10–6].

Seeds

Draw

Draw

References
 Doubles Draw

Fifth Third Bank Tennis Championships - Doubles
2010 MD